Teracotona seminigra is a moth in the family Erebidae. It was described by George Hampson in 1905. It is found in Ethiopia.

References

Endemic fauna of Ethiopia
Moths described in 1905
Spilosomina